Clubul Sportiv Municipal Satu Mare, commonly known as CSM Satu Mare, or simply as Satu Mare, is a Romanian football club based in Satu Mare, Satu Mare County, currently playing in the Liga III. This team represents the football section of the multi-sport club CSM Satu Mare, which also include basketball, volleyball and handball sections.

CSM Satu Mare was established on 18 July 2007 and is fully supported by the Municipality of Satu Mare. The football section of CSM was established only in 2018, after the second dissolution of Olimpia Satu Mare and was enrolled in the Liga IV Satu Mare. Despite the promotion obtained in 2019, CSM was not accepted in the Liga III by the Romanian Football Federation, after a late payment of the financial guarantee for participation in the 2019–20 Liga III season. The club based in Satu Mare promoted one year later, after a promotion play-off disputed in Zalău, against CA Oradea and Someșul Dej.

History
In the winter break of the 2017–18 season, Olimpia Satu Mare withdrew from Liga II due to financial problems, also having 70 points deducted. In the same time, the local authorities founded CSM Satu Mare, also known unformally as CSM-Olimpia Satu Mare, a new entity that pretend to be the successor of FC Olimpia, but has no legal connections with the old club.  Despite that, the club uses Olimpia's traditional colors, yellow and blue.

After this second dissolution of Olimpia Satu Mare, supporters, organized as Voluntarii Olimpiști (Olimpia's Volunteers), dissatisfied with the way the club has been administered in recent years, have created their own club, Olimpia MCMXXI, a fan-owned phoenix club inspired by models such as: ASU Politehnica Timișoara, LSS Voința Sibiu or FC Argeș 1953 Pitești. This club also pretend to be the successor of FC Olimpia, but again, are not legal connection between the old entity and this new one. In recent years, other football clubs from Romania were also refounded by their supporters, but subsequently were recognized as the official successors of the original clubs, among them: Petrolul Ploiești or Oțelul Galați.

The football section of CSM was enrolled directly in the Liga IV Satu Mare. Despite the promotion obtained in 2019, CSM was not accepted in the Liga III by the Romanian Football Federation, after a late payment of the financial guarantee for participation in the 2019–20 Liga III season. The club based in Satu Mare promoted one year later, after a promotion play-off disputed in Zalău, against CA Oradea and Someșul Dej.

Ground

CSM Satu Mare plays its home matches on Daniel Prodan Stadium in Satu Mare, Satu Mare County, with a capacity of 18,000 people (1,500 on seats). The stadium was known in the past as Olimpia Stadium and is the historical ground of Olimpia Satu Mare.

Honours
Liga IV – Satu Mare
Winners (2): 2018–19, 2019–20

Players

First-team squad

 (on loan from UTA Arad)

Out on loan

Club Officials

Board of directors

Current technical staff

League history

References

External links
 

Football clubs in Satu Mare County
Satu Mare
Association football clubs established in 2018
Liga III clubs
Liga IV clubs
2018 establishments in Romania